Nathan Vardy (born 25 June 1991) is a former professional Australian rules footballer who  played for the West Coast Eagles in the Australian Football League (AFL). He previously played for the Geelong Football Club from 2010 to 2016.

AFL career
He was drafted by the Geelong Football Club with their fourth selection, and the forty-second overall draft pick in the 2009 national draft. He played four games for Vic Country at the 2009 AFL Under 18 Championships and finished equal fourth overall for hit-outs to advantage (13) and fifth for total hit-outs (59). He was selected to make his debut in round 9, 2011 against Carlton. He injured his hip against  in round 21, 2011, and was out for a calendar year. He made his return in round 23, 2012 against  after proving his fitness in the reserves.

At the conclusion of the 2016 season, Vardy was traded to West Coast. In 2017, with Nic Naitanui and Scott Lycett injured, Vardy had to take charge as West Coast's number one ruckman and played almost every game.

Statistics
Statistics are correct to the end of round 7, 2019

|- style="background-color: #EAEAEA"
! scope="row" style="text-align:center" | 2010
|
| 36 || 0 || — || — || — || — || — || — || — || — || — || — || — || — || — || — || — || —
|- 
! scope="row" style="text-align:center" | 2011
|
| 36 || 9 || 6 || 6 || 29 || 33 || 62 || 20 || 18 || 104 || 0.7 || 0.7 || 3.2 || 3.7 || 6.9 || 2.2 || 2.0 || 11.6
|- style="background-color: #EAEAEA"
! scope="row" style="text-align:center" | 2012
|
| 36 || 2 || 2 || 1 || 11 || 2 || 13 || 5 || 3 || 17 || 1.0 || 0.5 || 5.5 || 1.0 || 6.5 || 2.5 || 1.5 || 8.5
|- 
! scope="row" style="text-align:center" | 2013
|
| 30 || 10 || 11 || 2 || 45 || 43 || 88 || 29 || 19 || 113 || 1.1 || 0.2 || 4.5 || 4.3 || 8.8 || 2.9 || 1.9 || 11.3
|- style="background-color: #EAEAEA"
! scope="row" style="text-align:center" | 2014
|
| 30 || 0 || — || — || — || — || — || — || — || — || — || — || — || — || — || — || — || —
|- 
! scope="row" style="text-align:center" | 2015
|
| 30 || 3 || 5 || 0 || 19 || 20 || 39 || 13 || 8 || 42 || 1.7 || 0.0 || 6.3 || 6.7 || 13.0 || 4.3 || 2.7 || 14.0
|- style="background-color: #EAEAEA"
! scope="row" style="text-align:center" | 2016
|
| 30 || 1 || 1 || 0 || 2 || 4 || 6 || 2 || 5 || 11 || 1.0 || 0.0 || 2.0 || 4.0 || 6.0 || 2.0 || 5.0 || 11.0
|- 
! scope="row" style="text-align:center" | 2017
|
| 19 || 22 || 10 || 6 || 99 || 87 || 186 || 52 || 64 || 518 || 0.5 || 0.3 || 4.5 || 4.0 || 8.5 || 2.4 || 2.9 || 23.5
|- style="background-color: #EAEAEA"
|style="text-align:center;background:#afe6ba;"|2018†
|
| 19 || 10 || 7 || 4 || 37 || 44 || 81 || 26 || 29 || 148 || 0.7 || 0.4 || 3.7 || 4.4 || 8.1 || 2.6 || 2.9 || 14.8
|- 
! scope="row" style="text-align:center" | 2019
|
| 19 || 6 || 0 || 0 || 17 || 17 || 34 || 9 || 17 || 106 || 0.0 || 0.0 || 2.8 || 2.8 || 5.7 || 1.5 || 2.8 || 17.7
|- class="sortbottom"
! colspan=3| Career
! 63
! 42
! 19
! 259
! 250
! 509
! 156
! 163
! 1059
! 0.7
! 0.3
! 4.1
! 4.0
! 8.1
! 2.5
! 2.6
! 16.8
|}

References

External links

Living people
1991 births
Australian rules footballers from Victoria (Australia)
Geelong Football Club players
Gippsland Power players
West Coast Eagles players
West Coast Eagles Premiership players
West Coast Eagles (WAFL) players
East Perth Football Club players
One-time VFL/AFL Premiership players